Bamgogae-ro is an road located in Seoul, South Korea.

Stopovers
 Seoul
 Gangnam District

List of Facilities 
IS: Intersection, IC: Interchange

References

Roads in Seoul